François Le Peru (8 February 1940 – 13 January 2023), known by the pen name Fañch Peru, was a French teacher and writer of the Breton language.

Biography
Le Peru worked as a teacher in Tréguier for many years, where he was a member of the Cercle Culturel Ernest Renan. As a member of the Breton Democratic Union, he served as mayor of Berhet from 1983 to 2001.

Fañch Peru died on 13 January 2023, at the age of 82.

Works
Ur c'huzhiad avaloù douss-trenk (1985)
Teñzor run ar gov (1988)
Glizarc'hant (1988)
Bugel ar c'hoad (1989)
An Traoniennoù glas (1993)
Enezenn an eñvor (1994)
Etrezek an aber sall (1995)
60 pennad e brezhoneg bev (1996)
Kernigelled ar goanv (1997)
Hentoù ar C'hornog (1998)
Eñvorennoù Melen ki bihan rodellek (1999)
Va enezenn din-me (2000)
Eus an aod vev d'ar c'hoad don (2002)
Gwaskado (2004)
Gwenodennoù hon hunvreoù (2007)
Kanfarded Milin ar Wern (2008)
Ur vuhez kazh (2010)
Kan ar stivell (2012)
Bigorned-sukr ha bara mel (2014)
Ar C'hizeller hag ar Vorganez (2016)
E Seizh avel ar bed (2021)

References

1940 births
2023 deaths
French educators
French writers
French politicians
Mayors of places in Brittany
Breton Democratic Union politicians
People from Côtes-d'Armor